Celeste High School is a public high school located in the city of Celeste, Texas, United States and classified AA school by the UIL.  It is a part of the Celeste Independent School District located in northwestern Hunt County.   In 2015, the school was rated Met Standard by the Texas Education Agency.

Athletics
The Celeste Blue Devils compete in these sports - 

Cross Country, Football, Basketball, Powerlifting, Golf, Tennis, Track, Baseball & Softball

State titles
Girls Basketball 
1992(1A), 1993(1A)

Notable alumni
Shalonda Enis - (born October 3, 1974) is a former professional basketball player who played for the Washington Mystics and Charlotte Sting of the WNBA.
Jamaica Rector - (born  August 10, 1981) is a former NFL player

References

External links
Celeste ISD website
Celeste High School Graduation Lists at Texas A&M University–Commerce

Public high schools in Texas
Schools in Hunt County, Texas